Znachor may refer to:

 Znachor, a novel by Tadeusz Dołęga-Mostowicz
 Znachor (1937 film), Polish film directed by Michał Waszyński, based on the novel
 The Quack (Znachor), 1982 Polish film directed by Jerzy Hoffman, based on the novel